The 1998–99 Liga Artzit season was the last in which the league was the Israel's second tier, as at the end of the season the Israeli Premier League came into existence, replacing Liga Leumit as the country's top division. As a result, for the 1999–2000 season Liga Leumit became the second division and Liga Artzit became the third division.

Due to the restructuring, only one club, Maccabi Netanya, was promoted to the top division (which was reduced from 16 to 14 clubs). At the other end of the table, eight clubs were due to be relegated as the second division was reduced to 10 clubs. However, Bnei Sakhnin, who had finished eighth from bottom, were reprieved from relegation as Maccabi Jaffa, who had finished bottom of the top division, were relegated three levels to Liga Alef due to their budget not being approved by the Israel Football Association.

Although the bottom eight were due to be relegated to the third tier for the 1999–2000 season, three of them (Hapoel Ashdod, Hapoel Lod and SK Nes Tziona) were relegated two levels as like Maccabi Jaffa, their budgets for the 1999–2000 season were not approved by the IFA.

Final table

References

External links
Israel Second Level 1998/99 RSSSF

Liga Artzit seasons
Israel
2